A Luxembourg passport is an international travel document issued to nationals of the Grand Duchy of Luxembourg, and may also serve as proof of Luxembourgian citizenship. Besides enabling the bearer to travel internationally and serving as indication of Luxembourgian citizenship, the passport facilitates the process of securing assistance from Luxembourg consular officials abroad or other European Union member states in case a Luxembourg consular is absent, if needed.

According to the 2022 Henley Passport Index, citizens of Luxembourg can visit 189 countries without a visa or with a visa granted on arrival. Additionally, the World Tourism Organization also published a report on 15 January 2016 ranking the Luxembourgish passport 1st in the world (tied with British, Danish, Finnish, German, Italian and Singapore passports) in terms of travel freedom, with a mobility index of 160 (out of 215 with no visa weighted by 1, visa on arrival weighted by 0.7, eVisa by 0.5 and traditional visa weighted by 0). Citizens of Luxembourg can live and work in any member state of the EU, Iceland, Liechtenstein, Norway and Switzerland as a result of the right of freedom of movement granted in Article 21 of the EU Treaty. 

Every citizen of Luxembourg is also a citizen of the European Union. The passport, along with the national identity card allows for freedom of movement in any of the states of the European Economic Area and Switzerland.

Luxembourg biometric passports are valid for five years for bearers aged four and over, and valid for 2 years for children under four.

See also
 Visa requirements for Luxembourgish citizens
 Passports of the European Union
 Luxembourgish identity card

References

Luxembourg
Government of Luxembourg
European Union passports